Richard Nels Van Patten (born January 15, 1955), known as Nels Van Patten, is an American actor and former professional tennis player. He is married to actress Nancy Valen.

Born in Brooklyn, New York, Van Patten is the eldest son of actor Dick Van Patten and Patricia Helon "Pat ( Poole) Van Patten. He is named after the character "Nels Hansen" that his father played on the TV series Mama. His youngest brother, Vincent, was also a tennis player and the pair won a Challenger doubles title together in Athens in 1981.

ATP Challenger titles

Doubles: (1)

References

External links
 
 
 

1955 births
Living people
American male tennis players
American male film actors